The 2022 Gardner–Webb Runnin' Bulldogs football team represented Gardner–Webb University as a member of the Big South Conference during the 2022 NCAA Division I FCS football season. Led by third-year head coach Tre Lamb, the Runnin' Bulldogs played their home games at the Ernest W. Spangler Stadium in Boiling Springs, North Carolina.

Three milestones were reached for the program this season. For the first time since 2003, Gardner-Webb won the Big South championship. With it, they clinched an automatic bid to the NCAA Division I Football Championship, their first playoff appearance as an FCS team and first as a program since the 1992 NAIA playoffs. Their best season in 19 years would be further added on with a win over Eastern Kentucky in the first round of the playoffs, their first FCS playoff win in program history. They would ultimately fall to William & Mary in the second round.

Previous season

The Runnin' Bulldogs finished the 2021 season with a record of 4–7, 2–5 Big South play to finish in a tie for last place.

Schedule

Game summaries

Limestone

at Coastal Carolina

at Elon

No. 17 Mercer

at Marshall

at Robert Morris

at Liberty

at Charleston Southern

Bryant

at Campbell

North Carolina A&T

FCS Playoffs

at Eastern Kentucky – First Round

at No. 6 Wiiliam & Mary – Second Round

References

Gardner-Webb
Gardner–Webb Runnin' Bulldogs football seasons
Big South Conference football champion seasons
Gardner–Webb
Gardner-Webb Runnin' Bulldogs football